Kharota Khel .  Kharota Khel has no relationship with Kharotis (Ghilzais KABELA). The Kharotas are a subtribe of Niazi Tribe. The Tribesmen live in Deli Namdar, Tehsil Kalurkot, Bhakkar District, in the Punjab. The Tribe has land holdings in Bhakkar District.

References

Niazi Pashtun tribes
Pashto-language surnames
Pakistani names